Apantesis doris, the Doris tiger moth, is a moth of the family Erebidae. It was described by Jean Baptiste Boisduval in 1869. It is found in North America from British Columbia, northern Idaho, Alberta and western Montana. In the east, it is found in the Atlantic Coast provinces and from Nova Scotia to northern Florida and west to central Texas. The habitat consists of open willow/sedge fens and probably other open wetlands in the boreal forest.

The length of the forewings is about 19 mm. The forewings are light pinkish white with black markings. The hindwings are deep pink with pale rimmed black spots. Adults are on wing from June to August.

The larvae feed on various herbaceous plants, including Lactuca sativa and Taraxacum officinale.

This species was formerly a member of the genus Grammia, but was moved to Apantesis along with the other species of the genera Grammia, Holarctia, and Notarctia.

Subspecies
Apantesis doris doris
Apantesis doris minea (Slosson, 1892)

References

 

Arctiina
Moths described in 1869